Dilum Fernando (born 22 May 1994) is a Sri Lankan cricketer. He made his first-class debut for Kalutara Town Club in Tier B of the 2018–19 Premier League Tournament on 21 March 2019. He made his Twenty20 debut on 13 March 2021, for Bloomfield Cricket and Athletic Club in the 2020–21 SLC Twenty20 Tournament.

References

External links
 

1994 births
Living people
Sri Lankan cricketers
Bloomfield Cricket and Athletic Club cricketers
Kalutara Town Club cricketers
Place of birth missing (living people)